Runecraft was a British video game developer based in the United Kingdom.

Games developed

Defunct video game companies of the United Kingdom
Video game companies established in 1997
Video game companies disestablished in 2003
Video game development companies